Isles of Despair is a 1947 historical novel by Ion Idriess based on the true story of Barbara Thomson, a white woman who was the sole survivor of a shipwreck and was raised by Coral Sea islanders, before being rescued in 1849.

It had a follow up, The Wild White Man of Badu.

References

1947 Australian novels
Novels set in Oceania
Fiction set in the 1840s
Coral Sea Islands
Novels by Ion Idriess
Angus & Robertson books